The Garth Brooks World Tour is a concert tour by American singer Garth Brooks with Trisha Yearwood. Beginning on September 4, 2014, in Rosemont, Illinois, the tour is Brooks' first in thirteen years after coming out of retirement. It launched in support of his 2014 album, Man Against Machine, continuing through the release of his 2016 album, Gunslinger.

High demand has prompted multiple concerts to be added in each city, with Brooks performing two shows per night in some cases. With 390 shows performed following the conclusion of its eighth leg in 2017, the tour has broken the record for the most all-time concerts in a tour. It also holds the record for the highest-grossing country music tour of all time, surpassing Soul2Soul: The World Tour by Tim McGraw and Faith Hill.

Conception
Garth Brooks' first and second world tours, 1993–94 and 1996–98 respectively, were both successful. After his multi-year residency at Wynn Las Vegas, yet not embarking on a multi-city tour for thirteen years, Brooks announced plans for a world tour during an interview on Good Morning America in December 2013. He later confirmed his tour and plans for an upcoming album during a press conference on July 11, 2014. On July 15, Brooks stated on his website that each city on the tour would be individually released, and the first concert would take place at the Allstate Arena in Rosemont, Illinois. Days later, Brooks announced ten additional shows, all at the same arena. Brooks has continued the pattern of announcing the next city every few weeks, both in an effort to generate excitement and urgency, as well as an attempt to combat ticket resale. The tour was in extremely high demand. Typically, two or three shows were announced in one market at a time, with more shows added based on real-time statistics of demand.

Ticket sales and records

For the first concerts of the tour (what would become an eleven-show residency in Rosemont, Illinois), 180,000 tickets were sold within three hours, meriting comparison to Bruce Springsteen's 1999–2000 reunion tour comeback success. As the tour progressed, Ticketmaster began having issues handling the high demand for tickets. 53,000 tickets were sold for the Atlanta shows, despite fans waiting for more than two hours due to technical issues by the ticket distribution company.

Many arena's ticket sales records have been held by Brooks from his previous world tours; these have since been broken by Brooks again. The tour broke the record for most tickets sold for concerts in a single North American city (more than 201,000 tickets for a residency in Minneapolis). The same Minneapolis residency was also the most concerts held in a single city to date, featuring eleven shows. In January 2016, tickets went on sale for the tour's first stop in Canada, a five-show residency in Hamilton, Ontario. Having not performed in the country since 2012, the Hamilton concerts sold more tickets than Brooks' previous Canadian shows combined, breaking his ticket sales record for the entire province of Ontario.

Resale controversies
In keeping with Brooks' own tradition, each ticket sold for the tour is the same price, regardless of location in the venue. An issue that arose beginning with the first concerts on the tour has been high ticket resale prices. For example, tickets for the seven-show residency in Dallas were being resold online for an average price 21% higher than face value. Because of Ticketmaster's anti-resale policies, Brooks chose the company to be the official ticket sales company for the tour. Despite the optimism for a lack of extreme resale prices, Ticketmaster's partner resale sites and services began allowing individuals to sell marked-up tickets anyway. In the first weeks of the tour, Atlanta tickets were posted for sale on TicketsNow for as much as nearly 470% higher than face value (i.e. a $71.50 ticket being sold for $405). Brooks, a long-time proponent of banning increased price ticket resales, called out those marking up ticket prices, saying his ultimate goal is making concerts affordable regardless of seat location.

System crashes
Most venues featured on the tour opt for Ticketmaster as the only official ticket sales merchant. However, some venues have chosen to use either other companies, or their own ticket selling resource. High ticket demand has a pattern of causing stress on these alternative systems. On September 18, 2015 AXS, the merchant selling online tickets to Brooks' San Diego shows, became overwhelmed by demand for tickets and was forced to halt the sale; tickets were later sold the following week. A similar situation occurred on March 18, 2016 when Fargo, North Dakota's Fargodome independent ticket sales website crashed, prompting a later sales date as well.

Cancelled and rescheduled shows
Due to conflict with the 2015 Stanley Cup Finals, Brooks was forced to cancel all June 2015 concerts at the Amalie Arena in Tampa, Florida. These shows have not yet been rescheduled. In anticipation of the January 2016 United States blizzard, Brooks rescheduled two concerts at the Royal Farms Arena in Baltimore for the following weekend. Brooks was also forced to reschedule two concerts in October 2016 at the Amway Center in Orlando, Florida due to Hurricane Matthew. In anticipation of the storm, his Thursday and Friday night shows were moved to Saturday and Sunday afternoon.
Brooks also announced three concerts in Croke Park, Dublin, Ireland, in early 2014. This was subsequently extended to five shows, which led to conflict between Aiken Promotions and Dublin City Council, who would only grant permission for three of the five shows. Brooks, committed to all five shows, subsequently cancelled all the Irish tour dates.

Stage design

Stage design for the world tour was directly influenced by Garth Brooks, stating his main interest in the show was to both "wow" the crowd while also keeping the central focus of the concert on the music itself. The lighting design by Bandit Lites was commissioned by David Butzler, Brooks' long-time lighting director.

Concerts are performed in an "end stage" setting, rather than a "theatre in the round" configuration; however, tickets are sold for all seats in the areas, including those located behind the stage.

Before the start of the third leg, the stage received some renovations including wing expansions and video screen redesign.

Format and setlists

Show outline
Depending on the specific venue, the show begins with a performance from opening act and backing vocalist Karyn Rochelle. The stage consists of a large cube video monitor, featuring four sides showing Brooks' logo prior to the concert beginning. At the start, the cube is raised and Brooks appears as the first song is played. He begins his set, performing nearly all popular songs from his early albums. Yearwood then accompanies Brooks for a duet, followed by performing a select few of her songs. Brooks returns to perform additional songs, then two separate sets of encores.

Main set

As shown in the first legs of the tour, the first four songs are always the same. The concert begins with footage of Brooks' silhouette while singing the opening lines to the first song ("Man Against Machine" in the earlier shows, later replaced with "Baby, Let's Lay Down and Dance"). The bridge and final chorus are omitted and it transitions to "Rodeo", followed by "Two of a Kind, Workin' on a Full House", and  "The Beaches of Cheyenne". Next, depending on the venue, other songs such as "The River", "Two Pina Coladas", "Papa Loved Mama", and "Ain't Goin' Down ('Til the Sun Comes Up)". "Unanswered Prayers" follows, with the audience singing the entire song with little accompaniment from Brooks. Additional songs, including "That Summer", "The Thunder Rolls", and "We Shall Be Free" may follow. Excluding the opening, Brooks only performs one or two songs from his newer albums (such as "Ask Me How I Know" or "Mom"). When questioned on his lack of new songs in the setlist, he remarked, "I'm just like you... I see the guys I like and I want to hear the old stuff."

Brooks then begins singing "In Another's Eyes", as Trisha Yearwood enters the stage and performs the duet. Yearwood goes on to performs a select few of her songs, including "XXX's and OOO's (An American Girl)", "How Do I Live", "She's in Love with the Boy", and "Georgia Rain". Brooks then returns to sing "PrizeFighter" with Yearwood and transition back into his set. Additional songs performed by Brooks may include "Callin' Baton Rouge" and "Shameless". "Friends in Low Places" is then performed, followed by "The Dance" as the main set ends and the band departs from the stage.

Encores
At each concert, Brooks and crew return to the stage and perform "The Fever". Brooks dances on a conveyor belt as the drummer's sphere rises above the stage. Following the performance, the band leaves the stage once again. Brooks then returns, often unaccompanied, for what he dubs the "housekeeping segment", in which he scans the crowd for fans with signs requesting songs, performing them acoustically. In some instances (such as the Atlanta concerts in September 2014), he may also perform acoustic covers of songs like "Amarillo By Morning", "Night Moves", and "Piano Man". Regardless, the encore set commonly concludes with the band returning to perform "Much Too Young (To Feel This Damn Old)", or another classic song.

Special performances and broadcasts
During the second concert of the tour in Rosemont, Illinois on September 5, 2014, Kelly Clarkson made a surprise appearance to perform the duet "PrizeFighter", alongside Yearwood (Brooks normally sings Clarkson's verses). Clarkson also made an appearance and sang the duet once again at the concert in Atlanta on September 19, 2014. Brooks made national headlines in November 2014 after noting a fan's sign at a concert in Minneapolis. The sign, reading "Chemo this morning. Garth tonight. Enjoying the dance.", caught Brooks' attention during his performance of "The Dance". After getting emotional, Brooks expressed his support. Later that same month, Brooks performed "People Loving People" on the American Music Awards of 2014 live via satellite from the concert in Greensboro, North Carolina. On the second to last concert of Brooks' six-night residency in Boston on January 25, 2015, Lee Brice joined him on stage and the two performed "More Than a Memory". Brice also opened for Brooks during his first show in Bossier City on July 29, 2016 and again performed the duet during Brooks' set.

At a Pittsburgh concert on February 7, 2015, Brooks' birthday, Pittsburgh Steelers' coach Mike Tomlin, as well as players Ben Roethlisberger, Cameron Heyward,  Heath Miller, and Brett Keisel joined Brooks on stage, singing "Happy Birthday" and presenting him a jersey.

On November 10, 2016 a concert special showcasing the tour's shows from Yankee Stadium aired in 4K exclusively through AT&T and DirecTV on Audience.

Critical response

Ray Waddell of Billboard noted the tours imminent success, saying Brooks could generate "more than double U2's attendance record" on their U2 360° Tour (the all-time highest-grossing concert tour). Commenting on the show itself, Jon Bream of the Star Tribune described it as "all about Garth being Garth, being humble and hammy, sincere and silly, romantic and rowdy — and making the fans believe that he's having as much fun as they are." Melissa Ruggieri of The Atlanta Journal-Constitution noted Brooks' skill of "toggling between the barn burning slickness of 'Ain't Goin' Down ('Til the Sun Comes Up)' and the restrained acoustic beauty of 'Unanswered Prayers'."

Commenting on Brooks' return to his native state of Oklahoma, Brandy McDonnell of The Oklahoman remarked "the frenzied audience nearly drowned out Brooks' stellar band on several occasions." She later stated, "[Brooks'] talent and zeal as an entertainer remain unmatched." Also following a concert in the tour's second leg, Francie Swidler of The Denver Post stated, "Brooks seemed to want to make everyone in the arena to feel special, fan or not", noting that Brooks "made it all look effortless". After Brooks' 8-concert stint in Houston, Chris Gray of the Houston Press summarized the concert by saying, "Combine raw adrenaline, effortless showmanship, grade-A musical smarts, flawless execution, and enough heart to power the CenterPoint substation across the street from Toyota Center, and you’ve got a performer for whom there's no such thing as too much hype."

Tour dates

Cancelled shows

Personnel
 Robert Bailey – backing vocals
 Bruce Bouton – pedal steel guitar, lap steel guitar, electric guitar
 Garth Brooks – vocals, acoustic guitar, electric guitar
 Steve Cox – keyboards
 David Gant – keyboards
 Johnny Garcia – electric guitar
 Mark Greenwood – bass guitar, backing vocals
 Vicki Hampton – backing vocals
 Jimmy Mattingly – fiddle, acoustic guitar
 Mike Palmer – drums, percussion
 Karyn Rochelle – backing vocals
 Trisha Yearwood – vocals

Grossing
2014: $51.0 million from 51 shows
2015: $114.9 million from 120 shows
2016: $97.0 million from 102 shows 
2017: $101.4 million from 93 shows 

Total available grossing: $364.3 million from 366 shows.

See also
List of Garth Brooks concert tours
List of highest-grossing concert tours

Notes

References

External links
Garth Brooks World Tour official website

2014 concert tours
2015 concert tours
2016 concert tours
2017 concert tours
Co-headlining concert tours
Garth Brooks concert tours